Pseudodebis is a genus of satyrid butterflies found in the Neotropical realm.

Species
Listed alphabetically:
Pseudodebis dubiosa Forster, 1964
Pseudodebis euptychidia (Butler, 1868)
Pseudodebis marpessa (Hewitson, 1862)
Pseudodebis valentina (Cramer, [1779])
Pseudodebis zimri (Butler, 1869)

References

Euptychiina
Nymphalidae of South America
Butterfly genera
Taxa named by Walter Forster (entomologist)